Night Girl (Lydda Jath) is a fictional character in the 30th century of the DC Universe. She is a member of the Legion of Substitute Heroes, and of the most recent incarnation of the Legion of Super-Heroes.  She first appeared in Adventure Comics #306 (March 1963).

Fictional character biography

Pre-Crisis
Night Girl is a native of the planet Kathoon, a world which is in perpetual darkness, heated by an internal power source. Lydda has superstrength, given to her by her scientist father, but only at night or in deep shadow. Her powers were negated by the presence of ultraviolet energy.

In Pre-Zero Hour continuity, she unsuccessfully tried out for the Legion of Super-Heroes who rejected her on the basis that a power that only worked in darkness was impractical. After meeting fellow Legion reject Polar Boy, she became one of the founding members of the Legion of Substitute Heroes. While having powers with such a drastic limitation reduced her effectiveness as a superhero, she became quite skilled at martial arts. She had a crush on Cosmic Boy, which was her motivation for leaving Kathoon and trying out for the Legion in the first place.  She alone among the Subs avoided the bumbling comedic stigma which plagued her teammates. During the Five Year Gap tales, she and Rokk married and eventually had a son, Pol (named for Cosmic Boy's fallen brother, Legionnaire Magnetic Kid) and resettled back on her homeworld as her husband reformed the Legion. In the stories of the Adult Legion, Night Girl (now Night Woman) and Cosmic Man are married and have a child.

Post-Zero Hour
In Post-Zero Hour continuity, Night Girl made two very brief appearances, first in Legionnaires #43 as she was rejected at a try-out once again and joined the Legion of Substitute Heroes once more. In a nod to the previous continuity she noted that, had she been aware Cosmic Boy was on a secret mission, she might not have even made the attempt.

She was seen in one panel in Legionnaires #49 as she and Polar Boy talked about how the Substitute Legion had a long way to go until they were ready to take on a mission.

Threeboot
Night Girl appeared trying out for Legion membership by fighting Ultra Boy. She was later made a member of the Legion Reserves.

Post-Infinite Crisis
The events of the Infinite Crisis miniseries have apparently restored a close analogue of the Pre-Crisis on Infinite Earths Legion of Super-Heroes to continuity, as seen in "The Lightning Saga" story arc in Justice League of America and Justice Society of America, and in the "Superman and the Legion of Super-Heroes" story arc in Action Comics.  Night Girl is included in their number (although she was never a member of the Pre-Crisis Legion). Her relationship with Rokk Krinn never fully blossomed into a full romance, as Cosmic Boy states that he chose to sacrifice his chance at a personal life to ensure that his best friends, fellow founders Lightning Lad and Saturn Girl, could have one together.

Besides working with the Legion, Night Girl serves as one of the instructors at the Legion Academy.

Powers and abilities
Night Girl has the powers of superstrength equivalent to that of Superboy or Mon-El and durability (though not quite at Kryptonian levels), but only in darkness or deep shadow. Her powers fade immediately in the presence of direct sunlight.

Killing (or at least heavily injuring) creatures made of tangible shadow seemingly allows her to temporarily absorb their essence into herself and convert it into superstrength.

Since her superpowers are often unavailable, she has trained extensively and is a very capable hand-to-hand combatant.

In other media
NIGHT GIRL at the LEGION Collection

Night Girl appeared in two episodes of the Legion of Super Heroes animated series, "Lightning Storm" and "The Substitute". Both appearances were non-speaking.

References

Night Girl at the Legion of Super-Heroes Clubhouse

Characters created by Edmond Hamilton
Characters created by John Forte
Comics characters introduced in 1963
DC Comics characters with superhuman strength
DC Comics female superheroes